Golpayegan University of Engineering, also known as Golpayegan Faculty of Engineering and Technology, is a small faculty of engineering with limited branches in some fields of engineering and only in undergraduate and graduate level in Golpayegan, Isfahan Province, Iran. In the first academic year, 2000 - 2001, 50 students have been admitted in 2 majors including Mechanical Engineering and Industrial Engineering.
The University places emphasis on introducing students to actual working experiences through projects with local industrial companies. Since its foundation some new majors are added to the university’s program. Several new majors are being developed including chemistry, civil engineering and mechatronics (combined disciplines of mechanical and electronic). It is expected these new majors will attract more than 1500 students.

References

External links

Educational institutions established in 2008
Universities in Isfahan Province
2008 establishments in Iran